Koskoff is a surname. Notable people with the surname include:

Emma Tillinger Koskoff (born 1972), American film producer
Theodore I. Koskoff (1920–2007), American trial lawyer

See also
Kosoff
Kossoff